"December Song (I Dreamed of Christmas)" is a Christmas single commercially released by George Michael on 14 December 2009. The track was originally announced during one of the last dates on Michael's 25 Live tour. It was available for free on George Michael's official website on 25–26 December 2008.

The track was written by George Michael and longtime writing partner David Austin.

During the Gerry Ryan show, David Austin confirmed that the song had originally been written with the Spice Girls in mind. After a few failed deadlines, the song was going to be given to Michael Bublé but George Michael decided to keep it for himself.

The song features a sample from the Frank Sinatra recording "The Christmas Waltz".

George Michael performed the song live on 13 December for the final of the 2009 series of The X Factor. The day after the performance, physical copies of the song were sold out in one day, forcing George Michael's record label to print new copies. Many fans have commented on forums of their annoyance at not being able to buy a physical copy of the single, possibly also giving the song a lower chart position than its true potential. The song debuted at number fourteen on the UK Singles Chart.

Music video
The accompanying music video was Michael's second animated one, with 2002's "Shoot the Dog" being the first. The video featured Michael as a boy, and it shows his view of Christmas from a child's perspective; shown by the visualization of sunshine, lightbulbs, and motherly love.

Formats and track listings

CD single-EP / digital single-EP
 "December Song (I Dreamed of Christmas)" – 3:35
 "Jingle (A Musical Interlewd)" – 3:35
 "Edith & the Kingpin" (Live at Abbey Road) – 3:46
 "Praying for Time" (Live at Abbey Road) – 4:57
 "December Song (I Dreamed of Christmas)" (Video) – 3:56 [A]
 [A] CD single only.
The first commercial release was in 2009, with two releases following in 2010 and 2011, the latter being the first to be released on iTunes (which excluded the video).
 The limited editions of the 2009 and 2010 CD releases included a Christmas card.

Charts

References

Songs about dreams
British Christmas songs
2009 singles
George Michael songs
Songs written by George Michael
Songs written by David Austin (singer)
Song recordings produced by George Michael
2008 songs
Island Records singles